Tan Zhongyi (born 29 May 1991) is a Chinese chess grandmaster (GM) and former Women's World Chess Champion (2017–2018). She is the reigning Women's Rapid Chess World Champion.

Career
Tan was born in Chongqing. She won the World Youth U10 Girls Chess Championship twice, in 2000 and 2001, both held in Oropesa del Mar. In 2002, she won the World Youth U12 Girls Chess Championship in Heraklion.

In August–September 2008 at the Women's World Chess Championship she was knocked out in the second round by Pia Cramling by ½-1½.

In 2011, she won the women's chess tournament at the 2011 Summer Universiade in Shenzhen, contributing to China's team gold medal.
Tan won the Women's World University Chess Championship of 2012 in Guimarães. In 2013, she won the 3rd China Women Masters Tournament in Wuxi with a score of 6.5/9 points, 1.5 ahead of runners-up Valentina Gunina and Huang Qian. In 2014 Tan won the Asian Women's Blitz Championship in Sharjah.

In May 2015 she won the Chinese Women's Chess Championship in Xinghua. The following month, Tan won the 5th China Women Masters Tournament with 7/9, a full point ahead of second-placed Lei Tingjie. In August 2015, she won the Asian Women's Rapid Championship in Al Ain. On December 1, 2015, Tan Zhongyi won the 1st China Chess Queen Match, a knockout tournament held in Taizhou, Zhejiang, after defeating Ju Wenjun in the final in an armageddon game.

She won the women's gold medal for board 4 at the 42nd Chess Olympiad in 2016.

She reached the final of the Women's World Chess Championship 2017 against GM Anna Muzychuk. They finished the classical games 2-2 with one win each, sending the match to a rapid tie-break. Tan won the two-game tie-break by drawing the first game with Black and then winning the second game with White, and thus became Women's World Champion. This also earned her the title of Grandmaster.

She lost the Women's World Champion title to Ju Wenjun at the Women's World Chess Championship Match 2018.

In 2020, she won the women's top prize at the Gibraltar Masters.

In 2021, Tan achieved third place in the Women's Chess World Cup after winning against Anna Muzychuk with a score of 2.5 - 1.5.

In 2022, Tan won the Women's World Rapid Championship in Almaty, Kazakhstan, after defeating local player Dinara Saduakassova in the tiebreaker.

China Chess League
Tan Zhongyi plays for China Mobile Group Chongqing Company Ltd chess club in the China Chess League (CCL).

Personal life
She graduated from university in 2013.

See also
Chess in China

References

External links

Sohu Profile

1991 births
Living people
Chinese female chess players
World Youth Chess Champions
Chess grandmasters
Female chess grandmasters
Chess woman grandmasters
Chess players from Chongqing
Women's world chess champions
Universiade medalists in chess
Universiade gold medalists for China
Universiade bronze medalists for China
Medalists at the 2011 Summer Universiade
Medalists at the 2013 Summer Universiade